Mehfil Magazine was a Canadian-based South Asian lifestyle magazine, launched in 1993 by brothers Rana and Minto Vig. It was the first full colour South Asian glossy magazine of its kind in Canada. Their idea was simply to produce a periodical that would not only showcase the community to its own, but also provide a tool and a bridge to foster better cross-cultural harmony and understanding. The word "Mehfil" means "a gathering".
During its run, Mehfil Magazine featured the South Asian community's leading business men and women, writers, artists, social workers, law enforcement, politicians and students. It also tackled some of the South Asian community's toughest social and political issues, including the Air India bombing, sexual abuse, arranged marriages, health concerns such as diabetes, the plight of seniors, as well as the cultural challenges of a new generation trying to integrate. The magazine ceased publication in 2010.

Notable contributors
Rick Hansen, Guest columnist Mehfil Magazine April/May 1998
Peter C. Newman, Guest columnist Mehfil Magazine Aug/Sept 1997
John Peter Bell, Guest columnist Mehfil Magazine July 1997
Ray Perrault, Guest columnist Mehfil Magazine June 1997
Greg Douglas, The Vancouver Sun, Guest columnist Mehfil Magazine Dec 1997

Notable covers

Specialty publications

Mehfil Youth Magazine 
In April 1997, on Mehfil Magazine's fourth anniversary, Rana Vig and his brother Minto Vig launched MY Magazine (Mehfil Youth). The quarterly
magazine was released at The Grand Taj Banquet Hall in Surrey, BC where 700 'who's who' of the South Asian community had gathered
to celebrate the new publication. Then NDP Premier Glen Clark was on hand to perform a special unveiling ceremony to the sounds of Dal Dil Vog's rendition of 
the popular song, The Greatest Love of All. The event raised $50,000 for Surrey Memorial Hospital's Here for Kids campaign.

Vaisakhi Magazine 
In April 1996, Mehfil Magazine published its first edition of a special Vaisakhi Magazine and distributed it free of charge to attendees at the annual Vaisakhi parade held in Vancouver BC, and subsequently also in Surrey, BC.

RBC Mehfil Magazine Awards of Excellence
In 2009 Mehfil Magazine held a black tie gala dinner event at Vancouver's Waterfront Fairmont Hotel. CBC's Peter Mansbridge was the keynote speaker.

In 2010 Mehfil Magazine held its second gala dinner event where Montreal based comedian Sugar Sammy was the evenings emcee.

100 Year Journey
In 2014 Rana Vig launched The 100 Year Journey - a community project committed to preserving the stories of the South Asian pioneers that helped to build Canada. A 150-page book of the same name was released on 29 November 2014 at a sold out black tie gala where 500 ‘movers & shakers’ of the community gathered to be part of an historic evening. Among the attendees were British Columbia Premier Christy Clark and Federal senior cabinet Minister Jason Kenney who applauded the efforts of this unique inaugural publication and event.

Community cruiser
In 1995 Mehfil Magazine launched a community cruiser designed to attend both mainstream and South Asian community events to interact with people and to educate them about the South Asian culture. A special magazine that highlighted the South Asian community's history was produced and distributed to all attendees at events that the cruiser and its street team attended.

Community work
In 2009 Rana Vig and his brother Minto established the Mehfil Magazine Endowed Journalism Award at Kwantlen Polytechnic University.  Committed to inspiring future journalists to reach their potential, the Mehfil Magazine Endowment was created to encourage discussion about what role or significance, if any, ethnicity and cultural background should have in contemporary journalism. The endowment, which started at $40,000,9 has grown to $100,000 through various contributions made by the magazine and by Rana Vig.

References

External links

 Mehfil Magazine
 100YearJourney.com

1993 establishments in Canada
2010 disestablishments in Canada
Lifestyle magazines published in Canada
Defunct magazines published in Canada
Magazines established in 1993
Magazines disestablished in 2010